NF1 may refer to:
 Neurofibromatosis type I, a genetic disorder that can cause tumors (can be cancerous) and other health effects such as vision impairment, imbowed legs, and joint pain.
 Neurofibromin 1, a protein associated with the disorder above.
 Nuclear factor 1, a transcription factor.
 NF-1, a variant of the AA-12 machine gun rechambered for 7.62 NATO ammunition.
 NF1 (aka NGSFF/M.3), a specification for internally mounted expansion cards